Armani T'Bori Moore (born March 25, 1994) is an American professional basketball player for Stjarnan of the Icelandic Úrvalsdeild karla. He played college basketball at Tennessee. In 2017, he won the PLK championship and the Polish Cup.

Early life and high school
Moore was born and raised in Swainsboro, Georgia and attended Swainsboro High School for three years. He transferred to Mount Paran Christian School in nearby Kennesaw, Georgia before his senior year. As a senior, Moore averaged 22 points, 9.3 rebounds, 3.9 blocks and 2.6 steals as Mount Paran went 24-6 and advance to the second round of the 2012 Georgia High School Association Class A playoffs. He committed to play for the University of Tennessee over offers from Mississippi and the College of Charleston.

College career
Moore played four seasons for the Tennessee Volunteers. He started 16 games as a freshman and exclusively came off the bench as a sophomore before becoming a starter for the team going into his junior year. As a senior, he averaged 12.2 and 7.6 rebounds per game and was named honorable mention All-SEC. Over the course of his collegiate career, Moore scored 907 career points (7.1 PPG), 617 rebounds (4.8 RPG), and 131 blocked shots (1.02 BPG, 7th-most in school history) over 128 games (81 starts), which is tied for the 6th-most appearances in Tennessee history. He graduated from Tennessee with a degree in sports management.

Professional career
After going unselected in the 2016 NBA draft, Moore participated in the NBA Summer League on the Indiana Pacers team but was not signed by the team.

Stelmet Zielona Góra
Moore signed with Stelmet Zielona Góra of the Polish Basketball League (PLK) on August 13, 2016. In his first season of professional basketball, Moore averaged 8.0 points and 4.0 rebounds in 44 PLK games as the team went on to win both the PLK league title and the 2017 Polish Cup. He returned to Stelmet for a second season and averaged 7.3 points and 4.1 rebounds in 14 PLK games and 6.1 points and 3.3 rebounds in nine Champions League games, as well as 14.5 points and 7.0 rebounds in two FIBA Europe Cup games, before leaving the team.

EWE Baskets Oldenburg
After leaving Stelmet, Moore signed with EWE Baskets Oldenburg of the German Basketball Bundesliga (BBL) on January 1, 2018. With EWE Moore averaged 7.4 points and 3.9 rebounds per game over 22 BBL games and 9.3 points and 5.9 rebounds in seven Champions League appearances.

New Zealand Breakers
Moore signed with the New Zealand Breakers of National Basketball League (NBL) on June 6, 2018. He averaged 7.1 points, 4.2 rebounds, 1.7 assists in 24 games (no starts) for the Breakers as the team finished sixth in the NBL.

Eisbären Bremerhaven
Moore returned to the Basketball Bundesliga after signing with Eisbären Bremerhaven for the remainder of the 2018–19 Bundesliga season on March 25, 2019. Moore averaged 12.2 points, 3.1 rebounds, and 1.8 assists in nine BBL games (seven starts) as Bremerhaven finished 17th in the league and was relegated to the German Second Division.

Arka Gdynia
Moore signed with Arka Gdynia of the Polish Basketball League on October 14, 2019. He averaged 7.3 points, 4.5 rebounds and 2.6 assists in eight PBL games and 7.7 points, 3.8 rebounds, 1.2 assists and 1.0 steals over seven EuroCup games before leaving the team during the December transfer window.

EWE Baskets Oldenburg (second stint)
Moore returned to EWE Baskets Oldenburg after signing with the team on December 18, 2019. He averaged  5.4 points and 3.6 rebounds per game in EuroCup.

Start Lublin
On July 20, 2020, he has signed with Start Lublin of the Polish Basketball League.

Stal Ostrów Wielkopolski
On November 23, 2020, he has signed with Stal Ostrów Wielkopolski of the Polish Basketball League (PLK).

Eisbären Bremerhaven (second stint)
On January 20, 2021, he has signed with Eisbären Bremerhaven of the German ProA.

Stjarnan
In January 2023, Moore signed with Stjarnan of the Icelandic Úrvalsdeild karla.

Honours

Club
Zielona Góra
Polish Basketball League: 2016–17
Polish Cup: 2017

References

External links
Tennessee Volunteers bio
College Statistics at Sports-Reference.com
RealGM Profile
EuroBasket Profile

1994 births
Living people
American expatriate basketball people in Germany
American expatriate basketball people in Iceland
American expatriate basketball people in New Zealand
American expatriate basketball people in Poland
American men's basketball players
Asseco Gdynia players
Basketball players from Georgia (U.S. state)
Basket Zielona Góra players
Eisbären Bremerhaven players
EWE Baskets Oldenburg players
Guards (basketball)
New Zealand Breakers players
People from Swainsboro, Georgia
Stjarnan men's basketball players
Tennessee Volunteers basketball players
Úrvalsdeild karla (basketball) players